Flatøy Lighthouse is a coastal lighthouse in Steigen Municipality in Nordland county, Norway.  The lighthouse is located on the island of Store Flatøya on the southeastern part of the Vestfjorden.

History
The first lighthouse was built here in 1882. That building was torn down and replaced in 1966. The original lighthouse keeper's house is still standing and the 1966 tower is attached to the house. The new 1966 light was also automated. This light has a red or white flash (depending on direction) every five seconds.

See also

Lighthouses in Norway
List of lighthouses in Norway

References

Lighthouses in Nordland
Steigen
Lighthouses completed in 1966
1882 establishments in Norway